Chen Pucai was the father of Chen Youliang, the founder of the short-lived Chen Han dynasty.

Notes 

Yuan dynasty people